Atris may refer to:

 a'tris, an alternative rock band 
 Atris, a fungus moth genus, nowadays synonymized with Infurcitinea
 The descendants of Atri in Rigvedic mythology 
 Atris, a Jedi historian in Knights of the Old Republic 2.